Pennsylvania Railroad Bridge may refer to:

 Pennsylvania Railroad Bridge (Columbia, Pennsylvania), over the Susquehanna River
 Morrisville–Trenton Railroad Bridge, over the Delaware River
 Canal Street railroad bridge, Chicago, Illinois
 Fourteenth Street Bridge (Ohio River), Louisville, Kentucky
 Delta Trestle Bridge, Maryland and Pennsylvania Railroad, Delta, Pennsylvania
 Pennsylvania Railroad Old Bridge over Standing Stone Creek, Huntingdon, Pennsylvania
 Pennsylvania Railroad Bridge over Shavers Creek, Petersburg, Pennsylvania
 Fort Wayne Railroad Bridge, Pittsburgh, Pennsylvania, also known as the Pennsylvania Railroad Bridge
 Muddy Creek Bridge, Maryland and Pennsylvania Railroad, Sunnyburn, Pennsylvania
 Stone Bridge (Johnstown, Pennsylvania)